Admiral Sir Richard King, 1st Baronet (10 August 1730 – 7 November 1806) was a British naval officer and colonial governor.

Naval career
King was born in Gosport, the son of Curtis King and Mary Barnett.

He joined the Royal Navy in 1738 and served on HMS Berwick. In 1745 made a lieutenant in HMS Tiger and in 1756 he was promoted to commander of the fireship HMS Blaze. He took part in the capture of Calcutta in 1756 and commanded the landing party at the capture of Hoogly in 1757.

In 1763 he was given command of HMS Grafton and in 1770 he took over HMS Northumberland. He went on to command HMS Pallas from 1778 and HMS Exeter from 1779.

He was knighted in 1782 for his services near Madras, India. Promoted Rear Admiral in 1787, he was appointed commander-in-chief of The Downs in 1790. In 1792 he became a baronet and was made commander-in-chief and Governor of Newfoundland. While King was in office France had declared war on Britain and King captured St. Pierre and Miquelon for the British and was promoted Vice-Admiral in 1793.

He was elected Member of Parliament for Rochester in 1794, holding the seat until 1802. In 1794 he was appointed Commander-in-Chief, Plymouth and in 1795 promoted to Admiral.

Family
In 1769 he married Susannah Margaretta Coker; they had four recorded children including his son Richard.

See also 
 Governors of Newfoundland
 List of people from Newfoundland and Labrador

References

External links

|-

|-

1730 births
1806 deaths
Royal Navy admirals
Governors of Newfoundland Colony
Baronets in the Baronetage of Great Britain
Members of the Parliament of Great Britain for English constituencies
British MPs 1790–1796
British MPs 1796–1800
Members of the Parliament of the United Kingdom for English constituencies
UK MPs 1801–1802